Foxtrot is the fourth studio album by the English progressive rock band Genesis, released on 6 October 1972 on Charisma Records. It features their longest recorded song, the 23-minute track "Supper's Ready".

The album was recorded following the tour in support of their previous album, Nursery Cryme (1971), which saw them gain popularity, including a well-received slot at the Great Western Express Festival, Lincolnshire in May 1972. The album was written over the summer of 1972 and combined songs that had already been performed live with new material worked out in jam sessions. Recording began in August with John Anthony, but sessions were prone to tension and disagreements. After a short Italian tour, sessions resumed with Dave Hitchcock taking over production duties. The cover was the final Genesis work to be designed by Paul Whitehead, featuring a fox wearing a red dress. Frontman Peter Gabriel wore the dress and a fox's head on stage for the following tour, which gathered press attention and greatly improved the group's profile.

Foxtrot was the first Genesis album to chart in the UK, reaching , and received largely positive reviews. It went to number one in Italy, their first album reaching number one globally. A non-album single "Happy the Man" was released at the same time. The album has continued to attract critical praise and was reissued with a new stereo and 5.1 surround sound mix as part of their 2008 Genesis 1970–1975 box set.

Background 
By the end of 1971, Genesis consisted of frontman and singer Peter Gabriel, keyboardist Tony Banks, bassist and guitarist Mike Rutherford, guitarist Steve Hackett and drummer Phil Collins. They had played around 400 gigs in the UK, but had yet to achieve commercial success. However, they had begun to become popular abroad; their 1970 album Trespass had reached  in Belgium, while 1971's Nursery Cryme had reached  in Italy. The Italian leg of the tour in April saw Genesis play to large and enthusiastic crowds, which gave the band new ideas about what audiences could be expected from a successful touring band.

The tour concluded in May that saw Genesis perform a set at the Great Western Festival in Lincoln. Gabriel appeared wearing a jewelled Egyptian collar, black eye-make up, and had shaved the front of his head, which drew attention from the press. Upon returning home the group dedicated time to write and rehearse new material for a new studio album. Hackett considered leaving the band after feeling "fairly shattered" from the lengthy tour, but his bandmates persuaded him to stay and reassured him that they had liked his playing.

Production

Recording 
Initial rehearsals were held in a rehearsal space at Blackheath in London before they relocated underneath the Una Billings School of Dance in Shepherd's Bush. Some of Hackett's material that was used for his first solo album, Voyage of the Acolyte, was in fact rehearsed by the band during the Foxtrot sessions but was not developed further. Material that became "Watcher of the Skies" and "Can-Utility and the Coastliners" was performed live before recording of Foxtrot started.

Genesis recorded Foxtrot in August and September 1972 in London at Island Studios. They were set to record with producer John Anthony, who had worked with them on their new song "Happy the Man" earlier in the year, but escalating costs due to the slow progress of completing it caused disagreements among Anthony and Charisma Records, the group's label, so they looked for a new producer. Banks recalled Charisma were anxious for the group to make a hit recording. The group's first choice for producer was Bob Potter, who had worked with Charisma labelmates Lindisfarne with Bob Johnston engineering. The band did not get on with Potter as he disliked their music; he compared Banks's Mellotron opening to "Watcher of the Skies" to the soundtrack to the science fiction film 2001: A Space Odyssey and felt the song was better without it. Around this time, the band put an end to these unproductive sessions and undertook an Italian tour in August 1972 before resuming work on the album the following month. The group tried out Tony Platt as a producer, but this was abandoned owing to personality clashes. Genesis then settled with co-producer Dave Hitchcock and John Burns as engineer, who would continue to work with Genesis on their next three albums. Banks felt Hitchcock was not the best replacement for the job and disagreed with him over the album's sound.

During the album's sessions, Genesis recorded the live favourite "Twilight Alehouse", which had been performed when founding member and guitarist Anthony Phillips was in the band. It remained unreleased until it was put out as a limited single by ZigZag magazine and the band's fan club in 1973. A piece devised by Rutherford and rehearsed by the band in a 3/4 time signature was not used, but it was adapted by Hackett into "Shadow of the Hierophant" on Voyage of the Acolyte. The group tried an early take of the Banks-penned "Firth of Fifth" but it failed to inspire the band's interest. Banks worked on it over the course of the following year and it was released on their next album, Selling England by the Pound. When Charisma's owner Tony Stratton-Smith heard the album for the first time upon completion, he said to the band's friend and roadie Richard Macphail: "This is the one that makes their career". Stratton-Smith added: "I had to wipe a tear from my eye. Everything that one had believed about the band had come through". Banks was particularly pleased with Foxtrot which he thought contained no weak tracks.

Songs

Side one

"Watcher of the Skies" takes its title from a line of the 1817 sonnet On First Looking into Chapman's Homer by John Keats. The song begins with a solo played on a Mellotron that the band had bought from King Crimson. Banks was "searching for chords that actually sounded good ... because of its tuning problems" and settled on the opening two chords "that sounded great ... There was an atmosphere about them". Banks and Rutherford wrote the music during band rehearsals at a gig at the Palasaport, Reggio Emilia in April 1972 during their first Italian tour. The lyrics were written in Naples a week later. They wondered what an empty Earth would look like if surveyed by an alien visitor. Banks described them as "a sort of sci-fi fantasy" loosely based on the novel Childhood's End (1953) by Arthur C. Clarke and the Watcher race of extraterrestrials featured in the Marvel Comics. Rutherford thought they were "interesting words but they didn't sing very well". Collins felt the need to bring in "some tricky arrangements" into the song's rhythm from seeing Yes perform live.

"Time Table" features a romantic theme that yearns for tradition, decency, and an age of kings and queens that is banished by war and conflict. Written by Banks, he presented the song as a complete piece and had the band perform it. Melody Makers Chris Welch described the track as light relief and a "gentle but stirring pop song" after the "pounding excitement" of "Watcher of the Skies". Gabriel biographer Daryl Easlea considered the song the most overlooked from the Gabriel-era of the band's history with its "sweet and touching" flavour and its resemblance to Genesis songs of the late 1970s.

"Get 'Em Out by Friday" is a song described as a "comic opera" that Gabriel described as "part social comment, part prophetic". It was partly inspired by Gabriel's own landlord problems he was having with his flat (apartment) on Campden Hill Road, and a television documentary he had seen about housing in the borough of Islington. Similar to "Harold the Barrel" and "The Fountain of Salmacis" from Nursery Cryme, the song features characters with Gabriel adopting a different vocal style for each one. The track features four characters: John Pebble, a business man of Styx Enterprises; Mark Hall (aka The Winkler), an employee of Styx who evicts tenants; Mrs. Barrow, a tenant of a house owned by Pebble; and Joe Ordinary, a customer in a pub. The song starts with Hall informing Mrs. Barrow that her property has been purchased and must be evicted, but she refuses to leave, leaving Pebble to raise her rent. Hall then offers Mrs. Barrow £400 to move to a new property in Harlow New Town, which she does, before Pebble raises her rent again. After an instrumental section, the date is 18 September 2012 and Genetic Control announce on a Dial-A-Program television service its decision to shorten the height of all humans to 4 ft. Joe reasons this so housing blocks will be able to accommodate twice as many people. Rutherford and Collins singled out "Get 'Em Out by Friday" as one of the early Genesis songs that suffered from Gabriel's dense lyrics which made the track busy and crowded. Collins reasoned this as a downfall to the band's typical method of song writing whereby a track recorded instrumentally with the vocals written and recorded afterwards. Nevertheless, Rutherford considered the lyrics to be among Gabriel's best.

"Can-Utility and the Coastliners" was one of the first songs written for the album, and played during the Italian tour. It is based on King Canute and his inability to hold back the incoming tide. Welch theorised that the song may be in fact about Gabriel and the idea of a singer growing wary of his role and his flattering admirers.

Side two
Side two begins with "Horizons", a short guitar instrumental performed by Hackett that was recorded in the short time that Potter was the album's producer. It was written in the course of a year, and took musical inspiration from the Prelude of Suite No. 1 in G major, BWV 1007 for cello by Bach. He presented the piece to the group at a rehearsal on an electric guitar, though he had written it on a steel-string acoustic. Despite his nerves in playing it through, he initially thought the band would reject it. Hackett remembered Collins saying that there should be applause added to the end of the piece, and felt surprised when the band agreed to include it on the album. Hackett wrote it with English composers of the Tudor period in mind, including William Byrd, who often composed very short pieces, and a piece by Julian Bream. He pointed out the common mistake adopted by some listeners that "Horizons" was an opening to "Supper's Ready", but it did not bother him.

The rest of the second side contains "Supper's Ready", a 23-minute track formed of seven parts and the longest the band recorded. Gabriel believed the band's growing support as a live act gave them the confidence to start writing extended pieces. The song and its theme of good versus evil was inspired by an experience Gabriel and his then-wife Jill had with Anthony at Kensington Palace, when she reportedly entered a trance state as the room's windows suddenly blew open. Gabriel compared the ordeal to a scene from "a Hammer Horror film". Initially, the song took form as an acoustic track similar to "Stagnation" from Trespass or "The Musical Box" from Nursery Cryme, something the band wished to avoid repeating. To develop the piece further, Gabriel pitched his idea for what became the song's fifth section, titled "Willow Farm", on the piano. Banks noted the change from the song's more romantic introduction into "Willow Farm", with its "ugly chord sequence", worked as it took the song "into another dimension". Genesis went to the street and picked eight children to record vocals for the song and paid them ten 'bob' (shillings) each. "Apocalypse in 9/8" was improvised by Banks, Rutherford and Collins. It is a mostly instrumental performed in a 9/8 time signature that began with Rutherford playing his bass pedals which Collins recalled as "totally abstract with no time signature" and incorporated a drum pattern to it. Banks assumed his organ solo would have no vocals, but after Gabriel proceeded to record lyrics over it, something that he disagreed with initially, he said, "it only took about ten seconds to think 'This sounds fantastic, it's so strong. Banks picked "Apocalypse in 9/8" and "As Sure as Eggs Is Eggs" as "the best piece of composition" Genesis recorded during Gabriel's tenure as lead singer, but thought Gabriel had written the lyrics too quickly. Collins supported this view, who recalled Gabriel rushing to get them written while the backing tracks were being recorded.

Sleeve design 

The album's cover was the last of three Genesis releases designed by Paul Whitehead, following Trespass and Nursery Cryme. He was a former art director for the London-based magazine Time Out and gained inspiration from the lyrics to "Supper's Ready" which included references to the apocalypse. Whitehead wanted to present the Four Horsemen of the Apocalypse in an original way but it turned into something "a little more whimsical", with two horse riders being a monkey and an alien. The cover for Nursery Cryme had depicted croquet which represented the English upper class which Whitehead repeated on Foxtrot with the depiction of fox hunting. The croquet scene is also repeated, placed in the background which has the Victorian manor now replaced with a hole in the ground. Whitehead devised the album's title, which he had done for Trespass and Nursery Cryme as he recalled the group were stuck for ideas. He had heard the word "foxy", an American slang term for an attractive woman, during a visit in the United States, and "Foxy Lady" by The Jimi Hendrix Experience, which he used as inspiration to draw a female with a fox head. Whitehead's original illustrations for the three albums were stolen from the Charisma archives when it was sold to Virgin Records in 1983. Whitehead claimed that Charisma staff got wind of the imminent sale and proceeded to loot its office.

The cover was not well received by the band at the time. Gabriel felt less pleased with the design than Whitehead's previous works. Hackett felt "unsure" about the cover when he saw it for the first time, calling it a "strange" design that has made more sense to him over time. Banks thought it was the weakest cover Whitehead designed for Genesis. Rutherford felt the design was a decline in quality following the "lovely atmosphere" of the Trespass and Nursery Cryme covers, to Foxtrot which was "a little bit weak". Collins thought it was not "particularly special" and lacked a professional look.

Release 
Foxtrot was released in October 1972. A non-album single, "Happy The Man" was issued as a single at the same time. "Watcher of the Skies" was rerecorded in a shorter version for a single.

It became the band's highest-charting album at the time of its release, peaking at No. 12 on the UK Albums Chart during a seven-week residency on the chart. Like their previous three albums, Foxtrot failed to chart in the United States. It reached  in Italy, signifying their growth in popularity in Europe after Trespass had topped the charts in Belgium. Foxtrot is certified silver by the British Phonographic Industry (BPI) for shipments of 60,000 units.

Critical reception 

In his review for Sounds magazine, Jerry Gilbert thought Genesis "almost achieved the perfect album". At times he noticed "the overall sound does lack the required vitality" and moments where the band "are trying just that little bit too hard", but such moments "are sporadic", and considered it more interesting than Trespass and Nursery Cryme. Welch thought Foxtrot was "a milestone in the group's career", "an important point of development in British group music", and that the band had reached "a creative peak". A short critical review from Rich Aregood in the Philadelphia Daily News read: "Genesis still has trouble putting songs together, but they play and sing beautifully."

Retrospective reviews of the album have been largely positive. Stephen Thomas Erlewine said Foxtrot was "the first time that Genesis attacked like a rock band". François Couture, on AllMusic, described "Supper's Ready" as the band's "undisputed masterpiece". BBC Music gave a mixed review, liking the production but feeling the lyrics had dated.

The album ranked  in Rolling Stone magazine's list of the 50 Greatest Prog Rock Albums of All Time. XTC guitarist Dave Gregory said: "To this day Foxtrot is a magical album. "Supper's Ready" became like an addiction. It had such a great sound, and enough mystery to make you want to hear it over and over again ... To this day, I will never tire of it". Faith No More bassist Bill Gould named it one of the ten albums that changed his life.

Reissues 
Foxtrot was re-released in 1994 as a digitally remastered CD issued by Virgin. As part of the band's box set Genesis 1970–1975 released in 2008, Foxtrot was reissued as a hybrid CD/Super Audio CD with a new stereo and 5.1 surround sound mix with a DVD of previously unreleased bonus material. The reissue includes sleeve notes written by Queen drummer Roger Taylor.

Tour 
At the end of September 1972, Genesis played a warm-up gig at the National Stadium, Dublin. During the last song, "The Musical Box", Gabriel disappeared during the instrumental section, and re-appeared wearing his wife's red dress and a fox's head, mimicking Foxtrots front cover. He had deliberately avoided telling the band he would do this, but it resulted in him appearing on the front cover of Melody Maker and significantly raised the band's profile.

The tour covered Europe and North America between September 1972 and August 1973. It opened with a UK leg with Lindisfarne as co-headliners. The group played their first US shows during the tour, including a warm up show at Brandeis University in Waltham, Massachusetts followed by a gig at Philharmonic Hall in New York City with String Driven Thing in December 1972. The latter was in benefit for the United Cerebral Palsy Fund. Despite the band's critical opinion of the concert due to a lack of rehearsal time, technical problems, and a perceived unenthusiastic audience, it went down well with the crowd that requested more Genesis songs be played on local radio stations, thus increasing their exposure.

Track listing 
All songs composed, arranged, and performed by Tony Banks, Phil Collins, Peter Gabriel, Steve Hackett, and Mike Rutherford. Actual songwriters listed below.

Personnel 
Credits are adapted from the album's 1972 liner notes.

Genesis
 Tony Banks – Hammond organ, Mellotron, electric and acoustic pianos, 12-string guitar, backing vocals
 Steve Hackett – electric guitar, 6-string guitar, 12-string guitar
 Phil Collins – drums, backing vocals, assorted percussion
 Peter Gabriel – lead vocals, flute, bass drum, tambourine, oboe
 Mike Rutherford – bass guitar, bass pedals, cello, 12-string guitar, backing vocals

Production
 David Hitchcock – production
 John Burns – engineer
 Richard Macphail – technician, stage sound (sound friend)
 Paul Whitehead – sleeve design
 Armando Gallo – photography
 Barry Wentzell – photography
 Geoff Terrill – photography
 Martin Nunn – photography

Charts

Certifications

References 
Citations

Books

 
 
 
 
 
 
 
 
 
 
 
 

DVD media
 

1972 albums
Genesis (band) albums
Virgin Records albums
Atlantic Records albums
Charisma Records albums
Albums produced by Dave Hitchcock